Yaudet Burbara Canahuati, also known as Júnior Burbara (born July 21, 1971) is a Honduran engineer, businessman and politician of Palestinian ancestry. He was born in San Pedro Sula, Cortés.
He currently serves as a deputy in the National Congress of Honduras representing the National Party of Honduras for the Department of Cortés. His first term began on January 27, 2010, and he was re-elected in 2014 and 2018.

References

1971 births
Living people
Deputies of the National Congress of Honduras
National Party of Honduras politicians
People from Cortés Department